St. Roch is an unincorporated settlement in Lot 1 township on Prince Edward Island.

Communities in Prince County, Prince Edward Island